Bestawaripeta  is a village in Prakasam district of the Indian state of Andhra Pradesh. It is located in Bestawaripeta mandal of Markapur revenue division.

Demographics 

As per Population Census 2011 Bestawaripeta village has population of 7606 of which 3799 are males while 3807 are females. Average Sex Ratio of Bestawaripeta village is 1002 which is higher than Andhra Pradesh state average of 993. Population of children with age 0-6 is 780 which makes up 10.26% of total population of village. Child Sex Ratio for the Bestawaripeta as per census is 965, higher than Andhra Pradesh average of 939. Literacy rate of Bestawaripeta village was 79.09% compared to 67.02% of Andhra Pradesh.

References

Villages in Prakasam district